Stefan Majewski (born 31 January 1956) is a Polish former professional footballer and football manager.

Club career
Majewski was born in Bydgoszcz. He played for clubs such as Gwiazda Bydgoszcz, Zawisza Bydgoszcz, Legia Warsaw, 1. FC Kaiserslautern (West Germany), Arminia Bielefeld (West Germany) or Apollon Limassol (Cyprus).

International career
Most notably, he also played for the Poland national team, for which he played 40 matches and scored four goals. Majewski was a participant at the 1982 FIFA World Cup, where Poland won the third place, and at the 1986 FIFA World Cup.

Coaching career
Majewski later pursued a coaching career, he coached the team of Widzew Łódź in 2004–06. Between 2 October 2006 and 27 October 2008, he was the coach of Cracovia. On 18 September 2009, Majewski became the interim caretaker coach/manager for the Poland national football team following the dismissal of his predecessor Leo Beenhakker. Poland lost 2–0 to the Czech Republic in a 2010 World Cup qualifier match during his debutant match as the head coach. On 29 October 2009, Franciszek Smuda was named as the full-time coach of the team, meaning that Majewski's stint as caretaker manager was effectively over.

References

External links
 

1956 births
Living people
Polish footballers
Association football defenders
Polish football managers
Poland international footballers
1982 FIFA World Cup players
1986 FIFA World Cup players
Zawisza Bydgoszcz players
Apollon Limassol FC players
Arminia Bielefeld players
1. FC Kaiserslautern players
Legia Warsaw players
Ekstraklasa players
Bundesliga players
2. Bundesliga players
Cypriot First Division players
MKS Cracovia managers
Polonia Warsaw managers
Widzew Łódź managers
Sportspeople from Bydgoszcz
Amica Wronki managers
Freiburger FC players
Polish expatriate footballers
Polish expatriate sportspeople in Germany
Expatriate footballers in Germany
Polish expatriate sportspeople in Cyprus
Expatriate footballers in Cyprus
Polish expatriate football managers
Polish expatriate sportspeople in West Germany
Expatriate footballers in West Germany